Robert James Wilson (born 5 June 1961 in Kensington, Greater London) is a former professional footballer. He played for Fulham, Millwall, Luton Town, Huddersfield Town, Rotherham United and Farnborough Town.

He earned two caps for the Republic of Ireland U21 side.

References
General

Specific

1961 births
Living people
English footballers
Footballers from Kensington
Association football midfielders
English Football League players
Fulham F.C. players
Millwall F.C. players
Luton Town F.C. players
Huddersfield Town A.F.C. players
Rotherham United F.C. players
Farnborough F.C. players
Republic of Ireland under-21 international footballers
English people of Irish descent